Peda Manapuram is a village panchayat in Dattirajeru mandal of Vizianagaram district in Andhra Pradesh, India.

References

Villages in Vizianagaram district